David J. Francis (born 2 December 1970 in Ottawa, Ontario) is a Canadian actor, director, producer, editor and screenwriter.

Career 
Francis began his career with minor roles in the television series Amazon (1999) and The Ladies Man (2000). His first major role was Jesus in Dracula 2000. In the early 2000s, he had more minor roles in the Canadian film The Matthew Shepard Story and as a floor manager in Gilda Radner: It's Always Something. In 2003, he directed his first film, a zombie film called Zombie Night.  He also served as writer and producer alongside his wife, Amber Lynn Francis. He returned as Jesus in the sequel to Dracula 2000, Dracula II: Ascension (2003) and had a minor role in the television movie Shattered City: The Halifax Explosion. Francis then directed his second movie, the sequel to Zombie Night, Zombie Night 2: Awakening (2006) and the third movie of the trilogy, Reel Zombies (2008).

Personal life 
Francis was married to actress and producer Amber Lynn Francis, who died on 19 March 2002, a few days after the birth of her child.

Filmography

References

External links 
 
 
 

1970 births
Living people
Canadian film editors
Canadian male film actors
Film directors from Ontario
Film producers from Ontario
Canadian male television actors
Male actors from Ottawa